Gregory Kurt Knafelc (born February 20, 1959
) is a former American football quarterback in the National Football League. He played for the New Orleans Saints in 1983. He played at college level at the University of Notre Dame.

See also
List of New Orleans Saints players

References

1959 births
Living people
Sportspeople from Green Bay, Wisconsin
Players of American football from Wisconsin
American football quarterbacks
Notre Dame Fighting Irish football players
Green Bay Packers players
New Orleans Saints players